The Journal of Circuits, Systems and Computers was founded in 1991 and is published eight times annually by World Scientific. It covers a wide range of topics regarding circuits, systems and computers, from basic mathematics to engineering and design.

The editor-in-chief of the journal is Professor Wai-Kai Chen and the five regional editors include Piero Malcovati from the University of Pavia, Emre Salman from Stony Brook University, Masazaku Sengoku from Niigata University, Zoran Stamenkovic from IHP GmbH, and Tongquan Wei from East China Normal University.

Abstracting and indexing 
The journal is abstracted and indexed in: 
 SciSearch
Scopus
 ISI Alerting Services
 Current Contents/Engineering, Computing & Technology
 Mathematical Reviews
 Inspec
 io-port.net
 Compendex
 Computer Abstracts

References 

English-language journals
Publications established in 1991
Electrical and electronic engineering journals
Computer science journals
World Scientific academic journals